Abdullah Niazi Qawwal (born 1960) (Urdu: عبداللہ نیازی قوال) is a Pakistani Qawwal. He belongs to the Qawwal Bachchon Ka Gharana of Delhi. He is the eldest son of Manzoor Niazi Qawwal (no relation to the Pashtun Niazi tribe).

Abdullah Niazi was one of the principal Qawwals in Manzoor Niazi Qawwal's group and after the death of Manzoor Niazi Qawwal, he led a Qawwali Group formed with his brothers. In 2015, he branched out with his sons supporting him. His performance style is steeped in Amir Khusro's Kalaam (verses) and has a based on Indian classical music. Abdullah Niazi carries the qawwali performance with a command and virtuosity rarely found in contemporary Qawwals capturing Amir Khusrow's poetry and its musical emotionality in all its subtlety and intensity. Abdullah Niazi Qawwal performs various genres of qawwali music such as Thumri, Khayal, Tarana, Sufism, and Classical. This was all evident in their concert performance at the National Academy of Performing Arts arranged by the All Pakistan Music Conference. 

Abdullah Niazi Qawwal is a descendant of Mir Qutub Bakhsh, who was awarded the title of Tanras Khan by the last Mughal Emperor Bahadur Shah Zafar. Tanras Khan was also the tutor in music and court musician of Zafar.

Early life and career
Abdullah Niazi Qawwal learned Qawwali from his late father Manzoor Niazi Qawwal and his late uncle Bahauddin Qawwal.

Abdullah Niazi with his three sons Waqas Ahmed, Saad Ahmed, and Fahad Ahmed are now promoting their family's traditional music.
They have performed in South Africa, United States, Canada, Norway, Denmark, Sweden, Dubai, Abu Dhabi, Muscat, India, Bangladesh, Saudi Arabia, Sri Lanka and many other countries.

TV Channels & Recordings 
Abdullah Niazi Qawwal has released many CDs/VCDs and Audio Cassettes. He also has recorded qawwalis on ARY Qtv channel and on Pakistan Television Corporation channel. He has recorded qawwalis on South Africa's Radio Lotus in 1989, Oslo Television in 1991, and on Door Darshan of India. Abdullah Niazi Qawwal also worked with Komal Rizvi in her video song Jhoolay Lal which was released by HMV India in 2013.

Awards 
Abdullah Niazi Qawwal are popular for their performances and they also have received many awards.

References

External links
Komal rizvi jhoolay lal features Abdullah Niazi Qawwal & Brothers

1960 births
Living people
Pakistani qawwali singers
Musicians from Karachi
20th-century Pakistani male singers
21st-century Pakistani male singers